Kennedy is a hamlet and census-designated place (CDP) in the town of Poland in Chautauqua County, New York, United States. The population was 465 at the 2010 census. From 1805–1841, the hamlet was known as Kennedy Mills, in honor of Thomas Ruston Kennedy, the founder of the local mills. The name was changed in 1841 to Kennedyville. Eleven years later, the name changed again, this time to Falconer in honor of Robert and William Falconer (the current Falconer was known as Worksburg until 1874). In 1860, on the request of an Erie Railroad official, the hamlet became Kennedy. The name was promptly placed on the railroad station constructed in 1861.

Geography
Kennedy is located in the northeastern part of the town of Poland in eastern Chautauqua County, in the valley of Conewango Creek, a tributary of the Allegheny River. U.S. Route 62 intersects New York State Route 394 in the center of the hamlet on the north side of Conewango Creek. US 62 leads south  to Exit 14 on the Southern Tier Expressway (Interstate 86 and New York State Route 17).

Demographics

References

Hamlets in New York (state)
Census-designated places in New York (state)
Census-designated places in Chautauqua County, New York
Hamlets in Chautauqua County, New York